The Persuaders! is an action-comedy series starring Tony Curtis and Roger Moore, produced by ITC Entertainment, and initially broadcast on ITV and ABC in 1971. The show has been called 'the last major entry in the cycle of adventure series that began 11 years earlier with Danger Man in 1960', as well as 'the most ambitious and most expensive of Sir Lew Grade's international action adventure series'. The Persuaders! was filmed in Britain, France, and Italy between May 1970 and June 1971.

Despite its focus on the British and American markets, The Persuaders! became more successful elsewhere. It won its highest awards in Australia and Spain, and Roger Moore and Tony Curtis were honoured in Germany and France for their acting.

The Persuaders! used many of the resources of Moore's previous show, The Saint. These included locations, and the idea of reusing many of the visible vehicles from episode to episode. The series' synth-laden theme music was composed by John Barry.

Premise
The Persuaders are two equally-matched men from different backgrounds who reluctantly team together to solve cases that the police and the courts cannot.

Danny Wilde, portrayed by Tony Curtis, is a rough diamond, educated and moulded in the slums of New York City, who escaped by enlisting in the US Navy. He later became a millionaire in the oil business, subsequently making and then losing several fortunes as a Wall Street investor. Curtis himself had suffered a tough childhood in the Bronx, and also had served in the US Navy. Curtis was 46 when he made The Persuaders, but he performed all his own stunts and fight sequences.

Lord Brett Rupert George Robert Andrew Sinclair, played by Roger Moore, is a polished British nobleman, educated at Harrow and Oxford, a former British Army officer and an ex-racing car driver, who addresses his colleague as "Daniel".

A pair of globe-trotting millionaire playboys, the men are brought together by retired Judge Fulton (Laurence Naismith) in the French Riviera. They instantly dislike each other and destroy a hotel bar during a fist-fight. They are arrested and delivered to Fulton, who offers them the choice of spending 90 days in jail or helping him to right errors of impunity. Grudgingly, Wilde and Sinclair agree to help Fulton to solve a case. He then releases them from any threat of jail.

The men develop a sparing affection for each other and soon stumble into more adventures, sometimes by chance, sometimes on commission from Judge Fulton. Although the Judge recurs in the series, he has no formal relationship with his two agents. Eleven episodes depict his finding a way to convince Wilde and Sinclair to act on his behalf. For instance, in "Angie, Angie" he easily convinces one of the pair. In "The Man in the Middle" he endangers his agents so that they must act on his behalf. When they are short of cash he lures them with money. In "Powerswitch" he manipulates events from the shadows, and Sinclair and Wilde do not know that he is involved.

Some episodes rely on Danny being mistaken for other people, usually by some bizarre coincidence. In "Element of Risk", he is mistaken for a criminal mastermind named Lomax, played by Shane Rimmer. In "Anyone Can Play", he is mistaken at a Brighton casino for a Russian spy paymaster.

In episode 12, "That's Me Over There", it appears that Sinclair has had a longstanding interest in crime-fighting, as he has had a dedicated telephone line installed for an informer on a master criminal. In episode 17, "Five Miles to Midnight", Sinclair tells Joan Collins's character that he is working for the judge because it has given him something worthwhile to do after his failed motor racing career. Wilde never reveals or explains his motives.

Title sequence
The Persuaders! titles and synthesiser theme, by John Barry, establish the background and current identities of the protagonists via split-screen narrative technique: two dossiers, one red, one blue, labelled Danny Wilde and Brett Sinclair simultaneously depict their lives. The younger images of Tony Curtis are genuine, whereas the images of Roger Moore (with one exception) were mock-ups created for the credits. As the biographies approach their current ages, a series of four short sequences combine live footage with torn newspaper clippings, connoting their excitingly peripatetic lifestyles. The conclusion shows them together enjoying a life of sport, drink, women and gambling. The titles were specifically designed so that neither actor would appear to have top billing, something both Moore and Curtis stipulated when they agreed to co-star.

The title sequence retains a certain cachet among professional film editors. In 1995, Peugeot released an advertisement for the 306 car, with the theme of the opening title sequence, the split-screen process and even the voice of Michel Roux, who dubbed Tony Curtis in the French broadcast of the original series. In 2007, France 2 satirically used it to introduce a report about relations between the newly elected French President Nicolas Sarkozy and his first Prime Minister François Fillon.

Cars
The protagonists drive signature cars. Danny Wilde drives a red left-hand-drive Ferrari Dino 246 GT (chassis number 00810). Brett Sinclair drives a UK-registered Bahama Yellow right-hand-drive 6-cylinder Aston Martin DBS (chassis number DBS/5636/R) with V8 wheels and markings. Both cars were provided to the show's producers courtesy of the respective vehicle manufacturers. The grey Rolls-Royce Silver Shadow chassis no. SRH2971 seen in the episode  That's me over there  is known as the most filmed individual Rolls-Royce motor car ever. 

As with Simon Templar – Roger Moore's character in the television series The Saint – Sinclair's car has personalised number plates of his initials: Simon Templar's were "ST 1", Brett Sinclair's are "BS 1" (except for one scene in the episode "The Gold Napoleon", where the car is seen with its real UK registration number PPP 6H). The true owner of the index number of Sinclair's car, Billy Smart, Jr., permitted its use in the series.

The Aston Martin from the show was sold by the factory after filming ended, via HR Owen in London, to its first private owner. It was restored in recent years by the Aston Martin factory, and is presently owned by divorce lawyer and art collector Jeremy Levison. Both Moore and Curtis had signed the underside of the car's boot (rear luggage compartment): Moore at Pinewood Studios in May 2003; Curtis at Cheltenham Racecourse in October 2008. In 2013, the Aston Martin DBS was an invited participant at two of Europe's most exclusive motoring concours, the Concorso d'Eleganza Villa d'Este at Lake Como, and the Salon Privé Concours in London.

Danny Wilde's Dino bears Italian registration plate MO 221400 (the 'MO' component represents the province of Modena, which happens to be the headquarters and manufacturing base of Ferrari). The exact whereabouts of the Dino today is unknown, but it is believed to be in private ownership in Italy.

Cast
 Tony Curtis as Danny Wilde
 Roger Moore as Lord Brett Sinclair
 Laurence Naismith as Judge Fulton

Production
The concept of The Persuaders! originated in one of the final episodes of The Saint, titled "The Ex-King of Diamonds", wherein Simon Templar (Moore) is partnered with a Texas oilman (Stuart Damon) in a Monte Carlo gambling adventure. Pleased with that combination, Robert S. Baker and Lew Grade funded the new series. Unusually, production of the series began and continued without contracts among the producers and Moore. Moreover, Moore's role as producer is not obvious from watching the series, but Curtis confirmed the fact: 'Roger was always like the host with the show, because it was his company that was producing it. I would say he was the largest independent owner of it; Roger and his company owned it with Bob Baker, and Sir Lew owned the rest of it.'

Curtis became involved in the series because ITC knew it needed an American co-star to ensure the series would be picked up by US television stations. Initially, the role was offered to Rock Hudson and Glenn Ford, but they each rejected the part. ITC then asked the American Broadcasting Company for a list of suitable actors, which included Tony Curtis. He eventually agreed, and flew to the UK in April 1970 to commence location filming.

Filming was conducted on location in Europe (such as location filming in France, Spain, Sweden, and Italy) and at Pinewood Studios in Iver Heath, Buckinghamshire. In total, 24 episodes of The Persuaders! were completed; each cost £100,000, (or approx. £1,800,000 in 2007) to make. Only one series of The Persuaders! was made because Moore accepted the role of James Bond in the 007 franchise. In the DVD documentary, The Morning After, Baker stated that Grade was prepared to finance a second series, despite its failure in America, by re-casting with Noel Harrison, son of Rex Harrison, as a replacement for Moore. Baker states that he convinced Grade that the dynamic that Moore and Curtis had worked out was unique, and it was better to leave the series as it stood.

During The Persuaders!, Moore acted — officially and practically — as his own wardrobe stylist. It stemmed from genuine sartorial interests and because he was the director of textile firm Pearson and Foster. Every episode carried the closing credit, 'Lord Sinclair's clothes designed by Roger Moore', with 'Roger Moore' written as a large signature.

Curtis and Moore relationship
There is much speculation about the professional relationship between Moore and Curtis, on- and off-set. In her autobiography Second Act, Joan Collins detailed how they did not get along when she was a guest star. She cited Curtis's foul temper as the reason why the set of the episode "Five Miles to Midnight" was tense. In a 2005 interview given to the British Film Institute, director Val Guest confirmed Collins's assessment of Curtis: 

In his autobiography, Still Dancing, Lew Grade noted that the actors 'didn't hit it off all that well",' because of different work ethics. According to Moore's autobiography, Curtis's use of cannabis was so extensive that he even smoked it in front of a police officer while filming at 10 Downing Street. Despite third-party claims, Curtis and Moore consistently maintained they had an amicable working relationship. Moore said: 'Tony and I had a good on- and off-screen relationship; we are two very different people, but we did share a sense of humour.'

In a 2005 interview, Curtis referred to Moore with affection and stated that he would not participate in a remake of The Persuaders! without Moore.

Reception

UK and US
Although the series was placed in the Top 20 of most-viewed television series in Britain throughout 1971, Lew Grade wanted it to do well in the profitable American television market. It followed his earlier series such as Man in a Suitcase, The Champions and The Baron. But The Persuaders! made little impact in America, airing on ABC on Saturday nights opposite Mission: Impossible. In an interview given in 2007, Curtis attributed the lack of success in the US to the ABC network failing to screen it at prime time.

ITC subsequently sought to repackage and re-release The Persuaders! in the American market, by editing eight of the episodes together and releasing them as four 90-minute TV movies (each comprising two episodes from the series, typically missing only their original opening and closing title sequences). These were:

London Conspiracy (from "Greensleeves" and "A Home of One's Own")
Sporting Chance (from "Someone Waiting" and "Anyone Can Play")
Mission: Monte Carlo (from "Powerswitch" and "The Gold Napoleon")
The Switch (from "The Ozerov Inheritance" and "Angie, Angie...") 
There was also a proposed fifth TV movie but was not completed this was
The Persuaders (from "Overture" and "The Man In The Middle")
But the trailer and opening is included in the 2006 Region 2 DVD/2011 Region B Blu Ray Network Special Edition set along with the 4 completed films and their trailers

Death Becomes Me (from "Someone Like Me" and "A Death in the Family")

International distribution
Despite the overall disappointment in the UK and USA, The Persuaders! sold well in other international markets, particularly Continental Europe. This success allowed ITC to recoup much of its production costs, soon after principal photography was completed. The series has remained popular in Germany, Denmark, France, Norway, Finland, Sweden, Russia, Hungary and Italy; episodes are still regularly repeated throughout Europe. For instance, DR2 in Denmark rebroadcast the entire series on weekday early evenings during the Spring of 2012.

Argentina, Chile: Dos Tipos Audaces ('Two Bold Characters')
Colombia Dos Tipos Audaces ('Two Bold Characters')
Belgium: De Speelvogels ('The Playboys') / Amicalement Vôtre ('Amicably Yours')
Denmark: De Uheldige Helte ('The Hapless Heroes')
Estonia: Kelmid ja Pühakud ('Crooks and Saints')
Finland: Veijareita ja Pyhimyksiä ('Rascals and Saints') [the rascal is Tony Curtis and the saint is Roger Moore, naturally]
France: Amicalement Vôtre ('Amicably Yours')
Germany: Die Zwei ('The Two')
Greece: Οι Αντίζηλοι ('The Rivals')
Hungary: Minden Lében Két Kanál ('Two Spoons in Every Soup')
Iceland: Fóstbræður ('Brothers in Arms')
Iran: کاوشگران  ('The Persuaders')
Iraq: ('The Persuaders')
Israel: המשכנעים ('The Persuaders')
Italy: Attenti a Quei Due ('Careful about Those Two')
Japan: ダンディ2 華麗な冒険 ('Two Dandies' Brilliant Adventures')
Latvia: Viltnieki ('The Tricksters')
Lithuania: Įtikinėtojai! ('The Persuaders!')
Mexico: Dos Tipos Audaces ('Two Bold Characters')
Netherlands: De Versierders  ('The Seducers')
Norway: Gullguttene ('Golden Boys')
Pakistan: کے محرک  ('The Persuaders')
Poland: Partnerzy ('Partners')
Romania: Brett și Danny ('Brett and Danny')
Russia: Сыщики – любители экстра-класса ('Extra Class Amateur Detectives')
Slovenia: Tekmeca ('Rivals')
Spain: Los Persuasores ('The Persuaders')
Sweden: Snobbar som Jobbar ('Snobs on the Job')
Turkey: Kaygısızlar ('Relaxed Ones')
Venezuela: Dos Tipos Audaces ('Two Bold Characters')
Yugoslavia: Suparnici ('Rivals')

In the UK, The Persuaders! had re-runs on Channel 4, Granada Plus, Bravo and ITV4 in the 1990s and 2000s. When the pilot episode, "Overture", was screened as part of Channel 4's nostalgia strand TV Heaven in 1992, that series' host (comedy writer Frank Muir) said in a Radio Times interview that The Persuaders! 'must have been the best bad series ever made... absolute hokum'. However, BBC Radio 5 presenter Dave Aldridge later asked: 'Was seventies TV really this good?'

Redubbed versions
Die Zwei, the German version of The Persuaders!, became a cult hit in Germany and Austria. This was largely because the dubbing was substantively altered, creating a completely different program. In France, Amicalement Vôtre ('Amicably Yours') was based on the re-dubbed German version instead of the English original .

The German dubbing was described as 'a unique mixture of street slang and ironic tongue-in-cheek remarks' and it 'even mentioned Lord Sinclair becoming 007 on one or two occasions'. Dialogue frequently broke the fourth wall with lines like 'Junge, lass doch die Sprüche, die setzen ja die nächste Folge ab!' ('Lad, just quit the big talk, or they'll cancel the next episode!') in S01/E05 at 44:36 or 'Du musst jetzt etwas schneller werden, sonst bist Du nicht synchron' ('You have to speed up [talk faster] now, or else you won't be in sync').

Research from the University of Hamburg notes the only common elements between Die Zwei and The Persuaders! are the images. Other than 'the linguistic changes entailed by the process of translation, result in radically different characterizations of the protagonists of the series. The language use in the translations is characterized by a greater degree of sexual explicitness and verbal violence, as well as an unveiled pro-American attitude which is not found in the source texts.'

In 2006, a news story by CBS News on the German dubbing industry mentioned The Persuaders! The report discovered that many German dubbing artists believed that 'staying exactly true to the original was not always the highest aim'. Rainer Brandt, co-ordinator of the German dubbing of The Persuaders! and Curtis' dubbing voice, said: 'This spirit was invoked by the person who oversaw the adaption and also performed [Tony] Curtis' role: when a company says they want something to be commercially successful, to make people laugh, I give it a woof. I make them laugh like they would in a Bavarian beer garden.'

Other researchers suggest that international versions of The Persuaders! were given different translations, simply because the original English series would not have made sense to local audiences. For instance, the nuanced differences between the accents and manners of Curtis, the American self-made millionaire Danny Wilde from the Brooklyn slums, and Moore, the most polished British Lord Sinclair, would be hard to convey to foreign viewers. Argentinian academic Sergio Viaggio commented 'how could it have been preserved in Spanish? By turning Curtis into a low class Caracan and Moore into an aristocratic 'Madrileño'? Here, not even the approach that works with My Fair Lady would be of any avail; different sociolects of the same vernacular will not do — much less in subtitling, where all differences in accent are irreparably lost.'

Awards and accolades
Winner – Logie Award 1972 Best Overseas Drama (Australia)
Winner – TP de Oro Award 1973 Best Foreign Series (Spain)
Winner – Bambi 1973 for Curtis and Moore (Germany)

Episode list
Airdates are from LWT London. ITV. Regions varied date and order (Granada and Anglia, for instance, transmitted a day earlier). The production number refers to the order on Network's DVD.

Home media
The entire series was remastered for DVD release in Europe in 2001.

In 2006, because of its popularity in Britain, a nine-disc DVD special edition boxed set was released, with extra material to the complete, uncut, re-mastered 24-episode series.

In September 2011, the Region B Blu-ray box set containing all remastered, restored episodes of The Persuaders! was released to considerable praise from reviewers.

In Region 1, A&E Home Video, under license from Carlton International Media Ltd., released the entire series of the classic '70s British cult adventure series on DVD in two volume sets in 2003/2004.

On 10 September 2014, it was announced that Visual Entertainment had acquired the rights to the series in Region 1 and would re-release all 24 episodes on DVD on 4 November 2014.

Remake
A motion picture was announced in 2005 with Steve Coogan and Ben Stiller. In 2007 Hugh Grant and George Clooney were later announced as the stars with Stiller attached as producer. The film was slated for a December 2008 release, but was never completed.

In popular culture
The iconic John Barry theme tune was also used as the walk on music by British Two-Tone pioneers The Specials.
The series' theme song was sampled in the video for the single "Lavender" by Snoop Dogg. It was also used diegetically in the movie Nocturama, directed by Bertrand Bonello

References

External links

Titles and Air Dates Guide
Official Persuaders appreciation society
Television Heaven
 The Persuaders Aston Martin DBS photo gallery

1970s British drama television series
1971 British television series debuts
1971 American television series debuts
1972 British television series endings
1972 American television series endings
American Broadcasting Company original programming
1970s British crime television series
Television series by ITC Entertainment
ITV television dramas
Television series produced at Pinewood Studios
English-language television shows